Enchanted April is a 2003 stage play by Matthew Barber, adapted from Elizabeth von Arnim's 1922 novel The Enchanted April.  The play opened on Broadway at the Belasco Theatre on April 29, 2003, in a production directed by Michael Wilson.

Plot 

Feeling lost in the shadows of marriage and forgotten in the rush of 1920s post-war society, two London housewives pool their savings to rent a villa in Italy for a ladies-only holiday away, reluctantly recruiting a pair of difficult upper-class women to share the cost and the experience.  Together under the Mediterranean sun, the four women clash — and then begin to bond and bloom — until men once again upset the balance.

Original Broadway cast 
 Jayne Atkinson as Lotty Wilton
 Molly Ringwald as Rose Arnott
 Dagmara Dominczyk as Caroline Bramble
 Elizabeth Ashley as Mrs. Graves
 Michael Cumpsty as Mellersh Wilton
 Daniel Gerroll as Frederick Arnott
 Michael Hayden as Antony Wilding
 Patricia Conolly as Costanza

Recognition 
 Outer Critics Circle Award for Outstanding New American Play
 Tony Award for Best Play nomination
 Tony Award for Best Actress in a Play (Jayne Atkinson) nomination
 Drama League Award for Distinguished Production of a Play nomination

References 

2003 plays
Broadway plays